The Valea Morii is a left tributary of the river Hârtibaciu in Romania. It flows into the Hârtibaciu west of Noiștat.

References

Rivers of Romania
Rivers of Sibiu County
Rivers of Brașov County